The 2022 NBL Uganda season was the 26th season of the National Basketball League of Uganda, organised by the FUBA. The season began on March 11, 2022 and ended on October 15, 2022.

It was the return of the NBL after a 2-year hiatus due to the COVID-19 pandemic in Uganda. This season, the licensing requirements were changed and all teams had to be registered and run professionally.

The City Oilers won their 8th consecutive national championship, after edging Nam Blazers 4–3 in the finals of the playoffs.

Regular season 
The regular season began on March 11, 2022. All teams played each other twice, once home and once away.

Playoffs 
The playoffs will begin on August 26.

Statistics 
Players that played at least 50% of the team's 24 games are included.

References 

2021–22 in African basketball leagues
Basketball in Uganda